Pauli Jokela better known as Paul Rey (born 23 May 1992, in Lund) is a Swedish singer and songwriter. Formerly known as PJ, Rey started his musical career as a rapper, and made his debut as a pop singer in 2015, releasing his debut extended play, Good as Hell in the United States through Epic Records. He gained public attention when he participated in Melodifestivalen 2020 with his entry, "Talking in My Sleep" (2020), which earned him a sixth place. In 2021, he again took part in Melodifestivalen 2021 with "The Missing Piece".

Early life
Paul Rey was born in Lund, his mother fled the Chilean dictatorship and started a new life in Paris in 1973, she came to Sweden as an exchange student. In Sweden she met Paul's father who came to Sweden through an exchange program in Finland.

Career
In 2015, Rey was signed to Epic Records in the U.S. And released his debut album "Good As Hell" the same year. Quincy Jones became his mentor soon after. In 2015, he also became an opening act during Fifth Harmony's tour. He also toured with Nico & Vinz.

In February 2017, he released the music single ”California Dreaming” along with Arnan Cekin and Snoop Dogg. He also released the single "All Falls Down".
In 2018, he released his album "Note to Self" which he produced himself.

Rey participated in Melodifestivalen 2020 with the song "Talking in My Sleep" and reached the finale, which took place on 7 March 2020. He ended up in sixth place, scoring a total of 68 points.

He then participated in Melodifestivalen 2021 with the song "The Missing Piece" and qualified for the final through the Andra Chansen round. He ultimately placed last in the final with 25 points which took place on 13 March 2021.

Discography

Studio album

Extended plays

Singles

As lead artist

As featured artist

Other appearances

References

External links

Living people
1992 births
Swedish male singers
Swedish people of Chilean descent
Swedish people of Finnish descent
People from Lund
Epic Records artists
Melodifestivalen contestants of 2023
Melodifestivalen contestants of 2021
Melodifestivalen contestants of 2020